The 1844–45 United States House of Representatives elections were held on various dates in various states between July 1, 1844 and November 4, 1845. Each state set its own date for its elections to the House of Representatives. 224 elected members representing 27 states took their seats when the first session of the 29th United States Congress convened on December 1, 1845. The new state of Florida elected its first representative during this election cycle, while one vacancy in New Hampshire's delegation remained unfilled for the duration of the 29th Congress.

The House elections spanned the 1844 presidential election, won by dark horse Democratic candidate James K. Polk, who advocated territorial expansion.

Democrats lost six seats but retained a large majority over the rival Whigs. The new American Party, based on the nativist "Know Nothing" movement characterized by opposition to immigration and anti-Catholicism, gained six seats.

Election summaries
One seat was added for the new State of Florida.  Texas and Iowa were admitted during this next Congress, but their initial elections were held in 1846.

Special elections

Alabama 

Elections were held August 4, 1845, after the March 4, 1845 beginning of the term, but before the House first convened in December 1845.

|-
! 

|-
! 

|-
! 

|-
! 

|-
! 

|-
! 

|-
! 

|}

Arkansas 

The election was held October 8, 1844.

|-
! 

|}

Connecticut 

Elections were held April 7, 1845, after the March 4, 1845 beginning of the term, but before the House first convened in December 1845.

|-
! 

|-
! 

|-
! 

|-
! 

|}

Delaware 

The election was held November 12, 1844.

|-
! 

|}

Florida 

The election was held May 26, 1845.

|-
! 
| colspan=3 | None (New state)
|  | New seat.New member elected late on May 26, 1845.Democratic gain.Winner did not serve, having also been elected U.S. senator.
| nowrap | 

|}

Georgia 

Elections were held August 7, 1844.

|-
! 

|-
! 

|-
! 
| Absalom H. Chappell
|  | Democratic
| 1842
|  | Incumbent lost re-election.New member elected.Whig gain.
| nowrap | 

|-
! 
| Hugh A. Haralson
|  | Democratic
| 1842
| Incumbent re-elected.
| nowrap | 

|-
! rowspan=2 | 
| John H. Lumpkin
|  | Democratic
| 1842
| Incumbent re-elected.
| rowspan=2 nowrap | 

|-
| William H. Stiles
|  | Democratic
| 1842
|  | Incumbent retired.Democratic loss.

|-
! 
| Howell Cobb
|  | Democratic
| 1842
| Incumbent re-elected.
| nowrap | 

|-
! 
| Alexander H. Stephens
|  | Whig
| 1843 
| Incumbent re-elected.
| nowrap | 

|-
! 
| Edward J. Black
|  | Democratic
| 18381840 1841 
|  | Incumbent lost re-election.New member elected.Whig gain.
| nowrap | 

|}

Illinois 

Elections were held August 5, 1844.

|-
! 

|-
! 

|-
! 

|-
! 

|-
! 

|-
! 

|-
! 

|}

Indiana 

Elections were held August 4, 1845, after the March 4, 1845 beginning of the term, but before the House first convened in December 1845.

|-
! 

|-
! 

|-
! 

|-
! 

|-
! 

|-
! 

|-
! 

|-
! 

|-
! 

|-
! 

|}

Iowa Territory 
See Non-voting delegates, below.

Kentucky 

Elections were held August 4, 1845, after the March 4, 1845 beginning of the term, but before the House first convened in December 1845.

|-
! 

|-
! 

|-
! 

|-
! 

|-
! 

|-
! 

|-
! 

|-
! 

|-
! 

|-
! 

|}

Louisiana 

Elections were held July 1–3, 1844.

|-
! 

|-
! 

|-
! 

|-
! 

|}

Maine 

Elections were held September 9, 1844.

|-
! 

|-
! 

|-
! 

|-
! 

|-
! 

|-
! 

|-
! 

|}

Maryland

Late elections to the 28th Congress 

Maryland elected its members to the 28th Congress on February 14, 1844, after that Congress had already convened in 1843 and long after the 1842–1843 election cycle.

|-
! 
| Isaac D. Jones
|  | Whig
| 1841
|  | Unknown if incumbent retired or lost re-election.New member elected.Whig hold.
| nowrap | 

|-
! 

|-
! 

|-
! 

|-
! 

|-
! 

|}

Regular elections to the 29th Congress 

Maryland's October 1, 1845 elections were after the March 4, 1845 beginning of the new term, but still before the Congress convened in December 1845.

|-
! 
| John Causin
|  | Whig
| 1844
|  | Unknown if incumbent retired or lost re-election.New member elected.Whig hold.
| nowrap | 

|-
! 

|-
! 

|-
! 

|-
! 

|-
! 

|}

Massachusetts 

Elections were held November 11, 1844.  At least one district, however, had multiple ballots stretching into 1846.

|-
! 

|-
! 

|-
! 

|-
! 
| William Parmenter
|  | Democratic
| 1836
|  | Incumbent lost re-election.New member elected on the second ballot.Whig gain.
| nowrap | 

|-
! 

|-
! 

|-
! 
| Julius Rockwell
|  | Whig
| 1844 
| Incumbent re-elected.
| nowrap | 

|-
! 
| John Quincy Adams
|  | Whig
| 1830
| Incumbent re-elected.
| nowrap | 

|-
! 
| Henry Williams
|  | Democratic
| 1836
|  | Incumbent lost re-election.New member elected on the ninth ballot.Whig gain.
| nowrap | 

|-
! 

|}

Michigan 

Elections were held November 5, 1844.

|-
! 
| Robert McClelland
| 
| 1843
| Incumbent re-elected.
| nowrap | 

|-
! 
| Lucius Lyon
| 
| 1843
|  | Incumbent retired.New member elected.Democratic hold.
| nowrap | 

|-
! 
| James B. Hunt
| 
| 1843
| Incumbent re-elected.
| nowrap | 

|}

Mississippi 

Elections were held November 3–4, 1845, after the March 4, 1845 beginning of the term, but before the House first convened in December 1845.

|-
! rowspan=4 | (4 seats)
| Jacob Thompson
|  | Democratic
| 1839
| Incumbent re-elected.
| nowrap rowspan=4 | 
|-
| William H. Hammett
|  | Democratic
| 1843
|  | Incumbent retired.New member elected.Democratic hold.
|-
| Robert W. Roberts
|  | Democratic
| 1843
| Incumbent re-elected.
|-
| Tilghman Tucker
|  | Democratic
| 1843
|  | Incumbent retired.New member elected.Democratic hold.
|}

Missouri 

Elections were held at-large on a general ticket August 5, 1844.

|-
! rowspan=5 | 
| 
| 
| 
| 
| rowspan=5 nowrap | 

|-
| 
| 
| 
|
|-
| 
| 
| 
|
|-
| 
| 
| 
|
|-
| 
| 
| 
|
|}

New Hampshire 

Elections were held at-large on a general ticket March 11, 1845, after the March 4, 1845 beginning of the term, but before the House first convened in December 1845.

|-
! rowspan=4 | 
| Edmund Burke
|  | Democratic
| 1839
|  | Incumbent retired.New member (Moulton) elected.Democratic hold.
| rowspan=4 nowrap | 

|-
| John Randall Reding
|  | Democratic
| 1841
|  | Incumbent retired.New member (Johnson) elected.Democratic hold.

|-
| Moses Norris Jr.
|  | Democratic
| 1843
| Incumbent re-elected.

|-
| John P. Hale
|  | Democratic
| 1843
|  | Incumbent lost re-election.No candidate elected on the fourth ballot; seat vacant.Democratic loss.

|}

New Jersey 

Elections were held October 9, 1844.

|-
! 

|-
! 

|-
! 

|-
! 

|-
! 

|}

New York 

Elections were held November 11, 1844.

|-
! 

|-
! 

|-
! 

|-
! 

|-
! 

|-
! 

|-
! 

|-
! 

|-
! 

|-
! 

|-
! 

|-
! 

|-
! 

|-
! 

|-
! 

|-
! 

|-
! 

|-
! 

|-
! 

|-
! 

|-
! 

|-
! 

|-
! 

|-
! 

|-
! 

|-
! 

|-
! 

|-
! 

|-
! 

|-
! 

|-
! 

|-
! 

|-
! 

|-
! 

|}

North Carolina 

Elections were held August 7, 1845, after the March 4, 1845 beginning of the term, but before the House first convened in December 1845.

|-
! 

|-
! 

|-
! 

|-
! 

|-
! 

|-
! 

|-
! 

|-
! 

|-
! 

|}

Ohio 

Elections were held October 8, 1844.

|-
! 

|-
! 

|-
! 

|-
! 

|-
! 

|-
! 

|-
! 

|-
! 

|-
! 

|-
! 

|-
! 

|-
! 

|-
! 

|-
! 

|-
! 

|-
! 

|-
! 

|-
! 

|-
! 

|-
! 

|-
! 

|}

Pennsylvania 

Elections were held October 8, 1844.

|-
! 

|-
! 

|-
! 

|-
! 

|-
! 

|-
! 

|-
! 

|-
! 

|-
! 

|-
! 

|-
! 

|-
! 

|-
! 

|-
! 

|-
! 

|-
! 

|-
! 

|-
! 

|-
! 

|-
! 

|-
! 

|-
! 

|-
! 

|-
! 

|}

Rhode Island 

Elections were held April 2, 1845, after the March 4, 1845 beginning of the term, but before the House first convened in December 1845.

|-
! 

|-
! 

|}

South Carolina 

Elections were held October 14–15, 1844.

|-
! 

|-
! 

|-
! 

|-
! 

|-
! 

|-
! 

|-
! 

|}

Tennessee 

Elections were held August 7, 1845.

|-
! 
| Andrew Johnson
|  | Democratic
| 1842
| Incumbent re-elected.
| nowrap | 

|-
! 
| William T. Senter
|  | Whig
| 1842
|  |Incumbent retired.New member elected.Whig hold.
| nowrap | 

|-
! 
| Julius W. Blackwell
|  | Democratic
| 1842
|  |Incumbent lost re-election.New member elected.Whig gain.
| nowrap | 

|-
! 
| Alvan Cullom
|  | Democratic
| 1842
| Incumbent re-elected.
| nowrap | 

|-
! 
| George W. Jones
|  | Democratic
| 1842
| Incumbent re-elected.
| nowrap | 

|-
! 
| Aaron V. Brown
|  | Democratic
| 1839
|  |Incumbent retired to run for Governor.New member elected.Democratic hold.
| nowrap | 

|-
! 
| David W. Dickinson
|  | Whig
| 1842
|  |Incumbent retired.New member elected.Whig hold.
| nowrap | 

|-
! 
| Joseph H. Peyton
|  | Whig
| 1842
| Incumbent re-elected.
| nowrap | 

|-
! 
| Cave Johnson
|  | Democratic
| 1839 
|  |Incumbent retired.New member elected.Democratic hold.
| nowrap | 

|-
! 
| John B. Ashe
|  | Whig
| 1842
|  |Incumbent retired.New member elected.Democratic gain.
| nowrap | 

|-
! 
| Milton Brown
|  | Whig
| 1841 
| Incumbent re-elected.
| nowrap | 

|}

Vermont 

Elections were held September 3, 1844.

|-
! 

|-
! 

|-
! 

|-
! 

|}

Virginia 

Elections were held April 24, 1845, after the March 4, 1845 beginning of the term, but before the House first convened in December 1845.

|-
! 

|-
! 

|-
! 

|-
! 

|-
! 

|-
! 

|-
! 

|-
! 

|-
! 

|-
! 

|-
! 

|-
! 

|-
! 

|-
! 

|-
! 

|}

Wisconsin Territory 
See Non-voting delegates, below.

Non-voting delegates 

|-
! 
| Augustus C. Dodge
|  | Democratic
| 1840
| Incumbent re-elected.
| nowrap | 

|-
! 
| Henry Dodge
|  | Democratic
| 1840
|  | Incumbent retired to become territorial governor of Wisconsin.New delegate elected on an unknown date.Democratic hold.
| nowrap | 

|}

See also
 1844 United States elections
 List of United States House of Representatives elections (1824–1854)
 1844 United States presidential election
 1844–45 United States Senate elections
 28th United States Congress
 29th United States Congress

Notes

References

Bibliography

External links
 Office of the Historian (Office of Art & Archives, Office of the Clerk, U.S. House of Representatives)